Wilhelm Knöchel (8 November 1899 – 24 July 1944) was a German Communist Party activist and organizer who after 1933 became an anti-government resistance activist.   His trial lasted ten minutes.   He was executed/murdered at the Brandenburg-Görden penitentiary, a short distance outside Berlin, to the west of the city.

Life

Provenance and early years
Wilhelm Knöchel was born into a Social Democratic working-class family in Offenbach, a short distance upriver from Frankfurt.   He qualified and worked as a factory machine operator ("Dreher").   In 1917 he was conscripted into the Imperial Army, shortly after which he was badly wounded.   There are also references to his having worked as a mines maintenance engineer ("Grubenschlosser").   In 1919, with Germany affected by acute economic hardship and, especially in the cities, a succession of revolutionary uprisings, Knöchel joined the Social Democratic Party ("Sozialdemokratische Partei Deutschlands" / SPD).   By 1920 he had relocated in search of work to the industrially vital and internationally critical Ruhr region.   Sources differ over whether it was in 1920 or 1923 that he switched to the recently created Communist Party.   Between 1924 and 1930 he was a member of the party leadership team for the Dortmund region ("...des Unterbezirk Dortmund").   In 1930, following the death of his first wife, he returned to  Offenbach, where it was arranged that his daughter should be brought up by relatives.   Knöchel was now employed as a party official.

National Socialist years
During the later part of 1931 or early in 1932 Wilhelm Knöchel relocated via Czechoslovakia to the Soviet Union where he worked as a miner.   Between 1932 and 1934 he studied at the International Lenin School ("Международная ленинская школа") run by the Comintern in Moscow.   While he was away, in January 1933 the National Socialists took power and lost no time in transforming Germany into a one-party dictatorship.   This meant that by the time he returned to Germany membership of the Communist Party had become illegal.   Knöchel nevertheless remained an active member, working from 1934 as a senior advisor ("Oberberater") for the underground party team in the "Wasserkante" (Hamburg) district in which, before the ban, the Communist Party had been particularly strong.

Knöchel attended the party's so-called "Brussels Conference" in Moscow in October 1935.   (It had been misleadingly identified in party communications as the "Brussels Conference" during the planning process in order to confuse the German security Services.)   He was elected a candidate for Central Committee membership.   By this time most of the active members of the German Communist Party had either been arrested or had fled into exile, and in 1936 he was sent to Amsterdam where he teamed up with Wilhelm Beuttel to set up a "western leadership team" for the exiled party:  most of the political activity in question was nevertheless undertaken, under conditions of extreme and growing danger, by comrades operating "underground" in the Rhineland, and most particularly in the Ruhr region where the focus was on communist resistance, organised through the (illegal) trades union movement in the economically important coal mines.   He was a co-founder and secretary of the "Communist Committee for German Free Trades Union Miners" ("...kommunistische Ausschuss freigewerkschaftlicher Bergarbeiter Deutschlands").  In 1938 he was elected to membership of the executive of "The Miners' International" ("Bergarbeiterinternationale").   Sources also refer to widespread education and propaganda work in the Rhine region.

War years
In January 1939 he attended the party's so-called "Bern Conference", which was held not in Switzerland but at Draveil, just outside Paris.  He was elected to full Central Committee membership and was given responsibility not just for activities in the Netherlands, but also in Belgium and Switzerland.   However, wartime conditions mean that communications channels between Amsterdam, where Knöchel had been living since 1936, and the remaining network of party activists across the border in Germany, were degraded or broken.   Sources are silent concerning his activities during 1940 and 1941.

On 8 January 1942 Wilhelm Knöchel re-entered Germany and, disguised as an itinerant specialist silver polisher, travelled illegally via Düsseldorf to the Ruhr region.   Here he was unable to find a safe location in which to set himself up.  He therefore moved on to  Berlin, where he was supported by Alfred Kowalke.   During 1942 he undertook several trips to Düsseldorf, Essen and Wuppertal which enabled him to engage directly in political discussions with workers in a number of different factories.  In addition, three of his contacts from his time in Amsterdam were still active in the Ruhr region.  From his base in Berlin, where he teamed up with Willi Seng to establish what became identified in some sources as the "Knöchel-Seng [resistance] group" ("Knöchel-Seng-Gruppe"), he was also able to retain far-reaching contacts with exiled party leaders in Stockholm, Amsterdam and, on a much more restricted basis, by radio, with fellow members of the party Central Committee in Moscow.   Relations with the leadership team in Moscow were always tense, however, and Knöchel moved from being critical of the directives received from the Moscow-based team.   As he wrote at one stage to his partner  Cilly Hansmann (1908 – 1984), who undertook courier work for him, "Are those guys in Moscow sitting on the moon?".

Sources are vague about what communist political activism inside Nazi Germany actually involved, but it certainly included producing and distributing political leaflets and more substantial publications, left casually on park benches, in public toilets or on trains and trams.   According to at least one source, exiled leaders of the German Communist Party had reacted to the outbreak of war at the end of 1939 with a resolution that comrades abroad should infiltrate themselves back into Germany and engage in political activism, following instructions from the exiled party Central Committee team in Moscow.   It seems, however, that Wilhelm Knöchel and a relatively small number of his associates were the only ones who successfully made the attempt to establish a communist resistance group in Germany during this period.   There were reasons.   During January several members of the group were captured, starting on 12 January 1943 with Alfons Kaps.   Kaps was interrogated and severely tortured and, it is inferred, provided information that led his interrogators to other resistance group members.  On 30 January 1943 Wilhelm Knöchel was also arrested, in the Berlin apartment of comrades Charlotte and Erich Garske.   The arrest of this exceptionally productive anti-Nazi activist represented a major triumph for the security services.   An attempt to lure him to a meeting, set up by his senior comrade Willi Seng a few days earlier, had failed because he had been ill in bed, too ill to attend.   It turned out that several comrades, including Seng, had been arrested on 20 January and subjected to "enhanced interrogation techniques" (torture) in order to persuade him to set up that meeting.   It seems that when the meeting had failed to take place Seng had also been persuaded to disclose Knöchel's Berlin hiding place.

Following his arrested it is likely that Wilhelm Knöchel was subjected to the same levels of extreme torture as Seng (and others arrested at the same time).   It is known that on 17 February 1943 he offered his Gestapo interrogators a deal that would involve his working for them as a "V-Mann" (collaborator / informant).   Subsequent speculation on why he did this has been inconclusive, although there is no shortage of theories.   Following interrogation he was taken to the concentration camp (identified in some sources as a prison and in others as a camp) at Scheveningen on the Dutch coast.   During the summer of 1944 he was taken back to Berlin where, on 12 June 1944, he faced the special "People's Court".   Knöchel's "trial" was conducted by the court president, Roland Freisler, himself.   The hearing lasted just ten minutes, and ended with Knöchel being sentenced to death, found guilty under the all too familiar charge, in those times, of "Preparing to commit high treason" ("Vorbereitung zum Hoch- und Landesverrat").   Other members of the group, including Willi Seng, Alfons Kaps, Alfred Kowalke, and Wilhelm Beuttel were sentenced to death at the same time.   Wilhelm Knöchel was executed/murdered at the Brandenburg-Görden penitentiary on 24 July 1944.

Personal
During his time in the Ruhr region, in 1922, Wilhelm Knöchel married a war widow who came to the marriage with two children.   The couple's third child, Inge, was born in 1921.   His wife died young in 1930, however.

Notes

References

External links
 An edition of "Der Friedenskämpfer" (“The Fighter for Peace”), in German 

People from Offenbach am Main
Executed communists in the German Resistance
German Army personnel of World War I
Prisoners of Nazi concentration camps
Social Democratic Party of Germany politicians
Communist Party of Germany members
1899 births
1944 deaths
Lists of stolpersteine in Germany
Member of the Knöchel-Seng-Group
People from Hesse executed by Nazi Germany